Karl Magnus Pehrsson (born 25 May 1976) is a Swedish football manager and former professional player who is the Director of Football at Spanish club Vélez CF.

Club career
Pehrsson started his career in IFK Lidingö. He played for Djurgårdens IF and  IFK Göteborg in Sweden, as well as Bradford City in England.

For the 1999 season, he rejoined Djurgården. He retired from football as a player due to an injury in 2003.

International career
Pehrsson represented Sweden at the youth and B levels.

Managerial career
Pehrsson started his coaching career as assistant manager in Åtvidabergs FF. He then managed IK Sirius in 2006 and GAIS in 2008.

Aalborg BK (2009–2010)
In January 2009 he moved from the Swedish leagues to Denmark to coach the Danish Superliga team Aalborg BK.

In his first season AaB managed to finish the Superliga season in 7th with 3 wins and 7 draws from 16 matches under his management. AaB reached the 2008–09 Danish Cup final. In the UEFA Cup AaB were drawn against Deportivo La Coruña. AaB won the first leg at home 3–0 and the away leg 3–1 beating Deportivo 6–1 aggregate. AaB thereby earned a place among the last 16 where they faced Manchester City. After a 2–0 loss in Manchester in the first leg AaB fought back to tie the score with a 2–0 win at home, but were defeated by 4–3 on penalties.

In his first full season AaB finished 5th in the league with 13 wins, 9 draws and 11 losses. In the 2009–10 Danish Cup AaB were surprisingly knocked out in the round of 16 by 2nd Division (third tier) club Hobro IK and in Europa League AaB lost out to Bosnia and Herzegovina club FK Slavija in the second qualifying round.

With 9 points from the first 11 matches in 2010–11 Superliga season he was sacked on 11 October 2010 due to a poor start of the season.

Djurgårdens IF (2011–2013)
In May 2011 Pehrson was hired by Djurgården to replace Lennart Wass who had been sacked due to a poor start of the 2011 Allsvenskan.

In his first season he managed to bring the team up from 15th to finish 11th and safe from the relegation with a record of 10 wins and 5 draws from 24 matches under his management. In 2011 Svenska Cupen Djurgården were eliminated in the round of 16 by IFK Göteborg.

In 2012 season Djurgården finished 9th in the league with 8 wins, 13 draws and 9 losses. In 2012–13 Svenska Cupen Djurgården finished runners-up, but Pehrsson had already left the club after the quarter-finals.

On 26 April 2013 Pehrsson resigned as manager due to alleged threats against him, though police later dropped the investigation as no legal proof of the threats were found.

Estonian national team (2013–2016)
On 5 December 2013, Pehrsson was appointed team manager of the Estonian national team. His first match in charge was a win against Gibraltar on 5 March 2014. After a slow start  team's form began to pick up and Estonia held high hopes on Euro 2016 qualifying, but a 0–1 loss in a decisive match against Slovenia saw them finishing 4th in group. By mid 2016 the results start to deteriorate: 0–7 loss to Portugal and 0–5 to Bosnia and Herzegovina in 2016 was a blow to a team proud of their defensive record. Pehrsson left the post by mutual consent in September 2016.

Malmö FF (2017–2018)
On 23 November 2016, Pehrsson was appointed manager of Malmö FF. He led the team to their second consecutive domestic title, winning the 2017 Allsvenskan, but was knocked out of the 2017–18 UEFA Champions League in the second qualifying round.

On 14 May 2018, Pehrsson was sacked as manager of Malmö FF, as the club was placed 10th in Allsvenskan after nine rounds. Niclas Carlnén, managing director at the club, cited that the "results so far are a big disappointment" and stated that the decision was "sad but necessary".

Kalmar FF
On 27 November 2018, after the end of the 2018 Allsvenskan season, Pehrsson was presented as the new manager of Kalmar FF, a team who ended up at the 10th place in the league. He resigned in October 2019.

Vélez CF
In April 2022 he became Director of Football at Spanish club Vélez CF.

Honours

Player 
Djurgårdens
 Division 1 Norra: 1994
 Superettan: 2000
 Allsvenskan: 2002

Manager 
Malmö FF
Allsvenskan: 2017

Managerial statistics

References

External links

1976 births
Living people
Swedish footballers
Swedish expatriate footballers
Swedish football managers
Expatriate football managers in Denmark
Allsvenskan players
Superettan players
Djurgårdens IF Fotboll players
Bradford City A.F.C. players
IFK Göteborg players
English Football League players
Expatriate footballers in England
GAIS managers
AaB Fodbold managers
Djurgårdens IF Fotboll managers
Swedish expatriate football managers
Estonia national football team managers
Malmö FF managers
Association football midfielders
Kalmar FF managers
Allsvenskan managers
Swedish expatriate sportspeople in England
Swedish expatriate sportspeople in Denmark
Swedish expatriate sportspeople in Estonia
Expatriate football managers in Estonia
Danish Superliga managers
Sweden youth international footballers
Sweden under-21 international footballers
Footballers from Malmö
Vélez CF non-playing staff